Thelymitra hiemalis, commonly called the winter sun orchid, is a species of orchid that is endemic to Victoria. It is a winter flowering orchid with greenish sepals and blue or mauve petals with large, irregular, darker spots.

Description
The sepals are often greenish and the petals, including the  labellum have irregular, darker spots. The lobe on the top of the anther has a brownish back and crowded yellow or orange, finger-like calli. The side lobes have mop-like tufts of white hairs. Flowering occurs from June to August.

Taxonomy and naming
Thelymitra hiemalis was first formally described in 1988 by David Jones and Mark Clements and the description was published in The Orchadian. The specific epithet (hiemalis) is a Latin word meaning "of winter".

Distribution and habitat
The winter sun orchid grows in heath and is only known from a few records near Portland, Anglesea, Upper Beaconsfield and Blackburn.

Conservation
Thelymitra hiemalis is listed as "endangered" under the Victorian Flora and Fauna Guarantee Act 1988.

References

External links
 

hiemalis
Endemic orchids of Australia
Orchids of Victoria (Australia)
Plants described in 1998